Syarhey Pyatrovich Shtanyuk (tr. Sergey Petrovich Shtanyuk; born 13 August 1973), also known as Sergei Petrovich Shtanyuk, is a Belarusian former professional footballer who played as a defender. He captained the Belarus national side.

Career
Shtaniuk was born in Minsk and played in the Belarusian Premier League for Dynamo-93 and Dynamo Minsk before him and two team mates Pavel Michalevitsj and Aleh Poetsila decided to join Dutch amateur club Quick 1888 based in Nijmegen. He joined Russian club Dynamo Moscow in 1996 where he spent four years making over 100 appearances. After a short spell with Belgian club Royal Antwerp he joined English side Stoke City in the summer of 2001. In 2001–02 He played in 48 matches including the 2002 Football League Second Division play-off Final where Stoke beat Brentford 2–0 to gain promotion. He played in 47 matches in 2002–03 and won the player of the year award. He left in the summer of 2003 and returned to Russia where he played for Shinnik. He then played in Ukraine for Metalurh Zaporizhya and back in Russia with Luch-Energia Vladivostok, Rostov and Alania Vladikavkaz.

Career statistics

Club

International

Scores and results list Belarus' goal tally first, score column indicates score after each Shtanyuk goal.

Honours
Dinamo Minsk
 Belarusian Premier League: 1994–95, 1995

Stoke City
 Football League Second Division play-off final: 2002
 Stoke City player of the year: 2004

References

External links
 

1973 births
Living people
Belarusian footballers
Footballers from Minsk
Association football defenders
Belarus international footballers
Belarusian Premier League players
Russian Premier League players
Belgian Pro League players
English Football League players
Ukrainian Premier League players
FC Dinamo-93 Minsk players
FC Dinamo Minsk players
FC Dynamo Moscow players
Royal Antwerp F.C. players
Stoke City F.C. players
FC Shinnik Yaroslavl players
FC Metalurh Zaporizhzhia players
FC Luch Vladivostok players
FC Rostov players
FC Spartak Vladikavkaz players
Quick 1888 players
Belarusian expatriate footballers
Belarusian expatriate sportspeople in Russia
Expatriate footballers in Russia
Belarusian expatriate sportspeople in Belgium
Expatriate footballers in Belgium
Belarusian expatriate sportspeople in England
Expatriate footballers in England
Belarusian expatriate sportspeople in Ukraine
Expatriate footballers in Ukraine